Aunus may refer to:

 Aunus, Finnish for Olonets, a town and district in Karelia
 1480 Aunus, an asteroid
 Aunus expedition, a military conflict in 1919
 Aunus Group, a Finnish military formation 1942-1944
 Aunus Radio, a radio station 1941-1944